The 2022 Inline Speed Skating World Championships was the 70th edition of the Inline Speed Skating World Championships overall and was held in Vicente López (for the track events) and Buenos Aires (for the road events) in Argentina from 29 October to 2 November 2022. It was held as part of the 2022 World Skate Games in Argentina. It was the 8th edition of the championship to take place in Argentina and first to take place in Buenos Aires or Vicente López.

Medal summary

Men

Women

References

Inline Speed Skating World Championships
International sports competitions hosted by Argentina